Ginger Helgeson-Nielsen was the defending champion but lost in the final 3–6, 6–2, 6–1 against Nicole Bradtke.

Seeds
A champion seed is indicated in bold text while text in italics indicates the round in which that seed was eliminated.

  Julie Halard (quarterfinals)
  Ginger Helgeson-Nielsen (final)
  Ann Grossman (first round)
  Linda Harvey-Wild (second round)
  Fang Li (quarterfinals)
  Silvia Farina (semifinals)
  Natalia Medvedeva (semifinals)
  Patricia Hy-Boulais (first round)

Draw

External links
 ITF tournament edition details

WTA Auckland Open
1995 WTA Tour